Kirkwall Airport  is the main airport serving Orkney in Scotland. The airport is used by Loganair.

History 
The airport was built and commissioned in 1940 as RAF Grimsetter for the defence of the Scapa Flow naval base. In 1943, the Royal Navy's Fleet Air Arm took over, as RNAS Kirkwall then HMS Robin. Control passed in 1948 to the Ministry of Civil Aviation and in 1986 to Highlands and Islands Airports.

The following units were here at some point:

Airlines and destinations

Passenger

Cargo

Statistics and traffic

Annual traffic statistics

Busiest routes

Green energy
Hydrogen production by electrolysis of water was well under way in late 2020 in Orkney, where clean energy sources (wind, waves, tides) were generating excess electricity that could be used to produce hydrogen gas (H2). A plan was under way at Kirkwall Airport to add a hydrogen combustion engine system to the heating system in order to reduce the significant emissions that were created with older technology that heated buildings and water. This was part of the plan formulated by the Scottish government for the Highlands and Islands "to become the world’s first net zero aviation region by 2040".

Accidents and incidents
25 October 1979 – A Vickers Viscount G-BFYZ of Alidair was damaged beyond economic repair when the aircraft departed the runway after #4 propeller struck the runway. The nosewheel collapsed when the aircraft reached an intersecting runway.

References

Citations

Bibliography

External links 
 

Airports in Orkney
Highlands and Islands Airports
Kirkwall
Airports established in 1940
Civilian airports with RAF origins